Urban America Television (UATV) was an over-the-air television broadcast network in the United States targeted towards Black Americans. According to the company's website, the network had 70 affiliate stations. UATV claimed to have had a reach of 22 million households in the United States. It was a successor to the earlier American Independent Television network and began broadcasting December 3, 2001. Created and developed by Fred Hutton (among others) the early programming featured independent produced programs, along with 1930s and 1940s public domain race films.

The company was the only minority-certified television network with the National Minority Supplier Development Council.

Programming
The network aired some original programming, along with films and older sitcoms and dramas. Some programming was also syndicated in markets without UATV stations, but most of its affiliate base was in densely populated metropolitan areas.

Ceasing of operations
According to its filings with the Securities and Exchange Commission, Urban America Television experienced liquidity needs which severely hampered its ability to continue operations, and eventually lost the ability to pay for satellite and uplinking services, along with master control at the network level, effectively curbing the network's operations any further.

As a result, on May 1, 2006, Urban America Television suspended all operations indefinitely, eventually hoping to return if refinancing allowed it to return to the air, though this never occurred.

In response to UATV's unexpected termination, many affiliates were forced to find alternative sources of programming. Competing networks such as America One and 3ABN benefited from the failure of UATV, and stations such as WUHQ-LP in Grand Rapids, Michigan and WONS-LP in Olean, New York, simply changed to other minor networks. The digital age and the rise of subchannel networks with a much higher quality selection of programming and on-air production, including Bounce TV, also did in the majority of pre-digital minor networks, a fate likely to have befallen UATV even if survived into the digital age.

Attempted relaunch of assets as Punch TV/URBT TV
Though for all intents and purposes it has long left the air and is unlikely to return, an outside party purchased the remaining assets of UATV in 2012, attempting a new Black broadcast network concept called "Punch TV", and that parent company continues to trade publicly promoting UATV's return in various forums, albeit as a flat penny stock. As of 2018 however, this effort has resulted only in a low-distributed network under the Punch TV name with very little original programming made up mostly of public domain and brokered content, much of it in no way pertaining to Black American viewers or containing performers and actors of Black descent, such as the Canadian procedural drama Cold Squad. It only has scattered low-power station distribution, along with a now-terminated lease with Multicultural Broadcasting's KILM in the Los Angeles market, a station which effectively dissipated in September 2018 under the new ownership of Ion Media (KILM already shared the bandwidth of Ion's KPXN-TV under a channel share agreement) and became a simulcast of Ion Life/Plus, as was done with similar Ion arrangements (Multicultural terminated the Punch lease in August 2018). Other than that, the only signs of life for the network (which is not under the UATV name) have been required SEC filings, announcements of new corporate and creative officers, and occasional lifts in the penny stock's trading. In the summer of 2019, it rebranded again, as URBT TV.

Former television affiliates

See also
 List of United States over-the-air television networks

Defunct television networks in the United States
Television channels and stations established in 2001
Television channels and stations disestablished in 2006
2001 establishments in the United States